Paul Jeanjean (1874 – 1928) was a noted French composer and principal clarinetist of the Garde Republicaine Band and the MonteCarlo opera. While known primarily for his clarinet compositions, he also composed for other instruments, such as the bassoon and cornet. He studied with one of the most important clarinet teachers, Chrysogone Cyrille Rose.
His compositions for the clarinet are mainly studies for the practice of technical elements.
Every year, the Paris Conservatoire would call on the clarinet teachers to compose music for that of their own use and also for their students. As a result we now have many sets of studies for the clarinet.

Works
His works include:
18 études de Perfectionnement
16 Etudes Modernes
3 Books of 20 Etudes in each known as Etudes Progressives et Melodiques
25 "Technical and Melodic Etudes," in 2 volumes
'Vade-Mecum' for the Clarinet Player, 6 Special Studies
Au clair de la lune
Arabesques
Clair matin

References

Further reading

External links
 

1874 births
1928 deaths
Musicians from Montpellier
19th-century French composers
20th-century French composers
French male composers
French classical clarinetists
20th-century French male musicians
19th-century French male musicians